Fédération Cynologique de Géorgie (also FCG) is the national kennel club of Georgia. The FCG is the only kennel organization in Georgia officially recognized by Fédération Cynologique Internationale (FCI). FCG laiases with other canine clubs, holds shows, and helps to promote dog breeds.

Cynology refers to the study of dogs, usually by enthusiasts and breeders. It is not a recognized scientific discipline in English-speaking countries. It is the source of the English word cynic, which is directly related to canines. In English, the organization is Kynological Federation of Georgia (KFG), but it is more frequently referred to by its French name and uses the initials FCG.

History

Georgian cynology obtained an official status in 1991 when the FCG was founded. In 1997 the FCG joined the Fédération Cynologique Internationale as a contract partner. From 2001 the FCG became an associated FCI member.

From the day of its creation FCG has played a noticeable role in European cynology, and holds close business liaisons with canine organisations from multiple European countries. The FCG regularly holds both National and International (CAC, CACIB) single- and all-breed dog shows; supports and promotes multiple Georgian dog clubs, communities and kennels; actively popularizes such national breeds as Caucasian Shepherd Dog and Georgian mountain dog.

At present the FCG is the only kennel club in Georgia officially recognized by Fédération Cynologique Internationale.

Experts

Clubs
 Caucasian Shepherd Dog Club ‘BOMBORA’
 Georgian United Kennel Club
 Club ‘LORDLAMARI’
 Club ‘ELITA’
 Central Kennel Club
 Club ‘PRESTIGE’
 Club ‘KENNEL LAND’
 Club 'TOBE'
 Georgian Pointer Club
 Adjara Kennel Federation
(More about FCG Clubs...)

Commissions
 Show Commission
 Qualification Commission
 Breeds Commission
 Working and Sports Commission
(More about FCG Commissions...)

Senior Management
 Mr. Gia Giorgadze, President
 Mr. Zaza Omarov, General Secretary

References

Fédération Cynologique Internationale
Kennel clubs
Clubs and societies in Georgia (country)
Dog breeds originating in Georgia (country)

External links